BSA LifeStructures is an architectural and engineering firm headquartered in Indianapolis, Indiana. The firm has six regional offices in the United States that include: Austin, Texas, Denver, Colorado, St. Louis, Missouri, Indianapolis, Indiana, Raleigh, North Carolina and Tampa, Florida.

Work

BSA LifeStructures focuses on architectural and engineering services for the healthcare, research and higher education sectors. 

In 2008, the company designed the Discovery Learning Research Center at Purdue University. The project cost $17.5 million to complete and was finished in 2009.

References

Architecture firms based in Indianapolis
Companies based in Indianapolis
Engineering companies of the United States